The 1993 World Men's Curling Championship was held at the Patinoire des Vernets in Geneva, Switzerland from March 28 to April 4.

Teams

Round-robin standings

Round-robin results

Draw 1

Draw 2

Draw 3

Draw 4

Draw 5

Draw 6

Draw 7

Draw 8

Draw 9

Tiebreakers

Playoffs

Brackets

Final

References
 

Curling
World Mens Curling Championship, 1993
International curling competitions hosted by Switzerland
International sports competitions hosted by Switzerland
Sports competitions in Geneva
World Men's Curling Championship
20th century in Geneva
March 1993 sports events in Europe
April 1993 sports events in Europe